The sucker barb (Barbichthys laevis) is a species of cyprinid found in Southeast Asia. It is the only recognized member of its genus. In Pahang, Peninsular Malaysia, it was named Bentulu or Batu Hulu.

Footnotes
 

Cyprinid fish of Asia

Fish described in 1842